Kutsal Damacana: Dracoola is a 2011 Turkish comedy film, directed by Korhan Bozkurt, starring Ersin Korkut as a servant for a well-to-do family which is visited by legendary bloodsucker Count Dracoola.

Production
The film was shot on location in Istanbul, Turkey.

Synopsis
Sebahattin grew up eating birdseed after being abandoned in the yard of a mosque when he was a baby boy. A self-taught young man, Sebahattin starts working as a servant for a well-to-do family, where he develops an unrequited love towards the family's beautiful daughter, Demet. However, his platonic happiness will not be long-lived when the servants' wing of the mansion is visited one night by the legendary bloodsucker Count Dracoola.

Release

Premiere

General release 
The film opened on nationwide general release in 221 screens across Turkey on January 21 at number 2 in the national box office with a first weekend gross of US$520,818.

References

External links
 

2010s Turkish-language films
2011 comedy horror films
2011 films
Films set in Turkey
Turkish comedy horror films
Turkish sequel films
2011 comedy films